A Home with a View is a 2019 Hong Kong black comedy film directed by Herman Yau and starring Francis Ng, Louis Koo, Anita Yuen and Cheung Tat-ming, who also co-produced and wrote the screenplay. The film is an adaptation the play, Family Surprise, which was also written by Cheung.

Plot
In order to preserve the value of his assets, Lo Wai-man (Francis Ng) spent all of his savings and his father's retirements pensions to purchase an old-age flat in the middle of a noisy neighborhood, cohabiting with his neurotic wife, Suk-yin (Anita Yuen), unemployed son, Bun-hong (Ng Siu-hin), daughter, Yu-sze(Jocelyn Choi) who is going through puberty and his elderly, disabled father (Cheung Tat-ming). With tight living quarters, noisy neighbors, and less than desirable living standards, the Lo family often find themselves at each other's necks over the smallest of inconveniences. Luckily, through a window in the living room lies a distant view of the beautiful ocean which prevents the household from going insane. However, one day, the ocean view disappears after a billboard is illegally built on a neighboring building. With their only sense of relief in the crowded city gone, the Lo family begin to quarrel nonstop. In order to regain the peace within the household, the Lo family does everything in their power to remove the billboard and its owner, Wong Siu-choi (Louis Koo).

Cast

Main cast
Francis Ng as Lo Wai-man
Louis Koo as Wong Siu-choi
Anita Yuen as Suk-yin
Cheung Tat-ming as Grandpa
Lam Suet as Butcher

Special appearance
Anthony Wong as Cheung
Bowie Wu as Superintendent
Lo Hoi-pang as Chan Tai-hung
Law Kar-ying as Landlord
Lawrence Cheng as District council representative
Sam Lee as Environment protection officer

Other cast
Elena Kong as Betrayed wife
Evergreen Mak as Taxi driver
Kingdom Yuen as Guidance counselor
Lam Chi-chung as Mr. Lee
Anna Ng as Woman arguing in bus
Wilfred Lau as Man walking with dog
6-Wing as Mortgage company staff
C Kwan as Mortgage company staff
Joyce Cheng as CID officer
Mak Ling-ling as House department officer
Harriet Yeung as Real estate agent
Tyson Chak as Advertising company staff
Ng Siu-hin as Lo Bun-hong
Jocelyn Choi as Lo Yu-sze
Siupo Chan as Woman fighting for fish
J. Arie as Nurse in mental hospital
Anderson Junior as Commerce, Industry & Tourism branch officer
Angelina Lo
Yu Chi-ming as Fish stall hawker
Strawberry Yeung as Real estate agent
Ricky Wong as Male property viewer
Celine Ma as Female property viewer
Gill Mohindepaul Singh as Indian
Bonnie Wong as Chan Tai-hung's wife
Gladys Liu as Tenant
Mandy Yiu as Female tenant
Dickson Yuen
Kong Ling-ling as Mrs. Chiu
Renci Yeung as Property viewer
Kitty Yuen as Wong Siu-choi's nurse

Production
Filming for A Home with a View began in 11 December 2017 in Kwun Tong, where a blessing ceremony was held and was attended by director Herman Yau and cast members Francis Ng, Louis Koo, Anita Yuen, Cheung Tat-ming, Lawrence Cheng, Elena Kong and Evergreen Mak. The film is an adaptation of the play, Family Surprise, written by Cheung, who also serves as the film's producer and screenwriter while also donning elderly makeup to portray the role of Ng's father. Cheung revealed that he originally had no interest in playing the role and it was originally a female character in the play, but was persuaded by Ng to do so. Production for the film wrapped up in February 2018.

Release
On 19 March 2018, the film promoted at the 2018 Hong Kong Filmart, where its first poster and trailer was unveiled. There, it was also announced the film is slated to be released in the summer of 2018.

But it was then delayed and subsequently released in Hong Kong on 24 January 2019.

References

External links

2019 black comedy films
Hong Kong black comedy films
2010s Cantonese-language films
Films directed by Herman Yau
Hong Kong films based on plays
Films about families
Films set in Hong Kong
Films shot in Hong Kong
2019 films
2010s Hong Kong films